Wetlands, or simply a wetland, is a distinct ecosystem that is flooded or saturated by water, either permanently (for years or decades) or seasonally (for weeks or months). Flooding results in oxygen-free (anoxic) processes prevailing, especially in the soils. The primary factor that distinguishes wetlands from terrestrial land forms or water bodies is the characteristic vegetation of aquatic plants, adapted to the unique anoxic hydric soils. Wetlands are considered among the most biologically diverse of all ecosystems, serving as home to a wide range of plant and animal species. Methods for assessing wetland functions, wetland ecological health, and general wetland condition have been developed for many regions of the world. These methods have contributed to wetland conservation partly by raising public awareness of the functions some wetlands provide.

Wetlands occur naturally on every continent. The water in wetlands is either freshwater, brackish or saltwater. The main wetland types are classified based on the dominant plants and/or the source of the water. For example, marshes are wetlands dominated by emergent vegetation such as reeds, cattails and sedges; swamps are ones dominated by woody vegetation such as trees and shrubs (although reed swamps in Europe are dominated by reeds, not trees).  Examples of wetlands classified by their sources of water include tidal wetlands (oceanic tides), estuaries (mixed tidal and river waters), floodplains (excess water from overflowed rivers or lakes), springs, seeps and fens (groundwater discharge out onto the surface), and bogs and vernal ponds (rainfall or meltwater). Some wetlands have multiple types of plants and are fed by multiple sources of water, making them difficult to classify. The world's largest wetlands include the Amazon River basin, the West Siberian Plain, the Pantanal in South America, and the Sundarbans in the Ganges-Brahmaputra delta.  

Wetlands contribute a number of functions that benefit people. These are called ecosystem services and include water purification, groundwater replenishment, stabilization of shorelines and storm protection, water storage and flood control, processing of carbon (carbon fixation, decomposition and sequestration), other nutrients and pollutants, and support of plants and animals. Wetlands are reservoirs of biodiversity and provide wetland products. According to the UN Millennium Ecosystem Assessment, wetlands are more affected by environmental degradation than any other ecosystem on Earth. Wetlands can be important sources and sinks of carbon, depending on the specific wetland, and thus will play an important role in climate change and need to be considered in attempts to mitigate climate change. However, some wetlands are a significant source of methane emissions and some are also emitters of nitrous oxide. Constructed wetlands are designed and built to treat municipal and industrial wastewater as well as to divert stormwater runoff. Constructed wetlands may also play a role in water-sensitive urban design.

Definitions and terminology

Technical definitions
A simplified definition of wetland is "an area of land that is usually saturated with water". More precisely, wetlands are areas where "water covers the soil, or is present either at or near the surface of the soil all year or for varying periods of time during the year, including during the growing season". A patch of land that develops pools of water after a rain storm would not necessarily be considered a "wetland", even though the land is wet. Wetlands have unique characteristics: they are generally distinguished from other water bodies or landforms based on their water level and on the types of plants that live within them. Specifically, wetlands are characterized as having a water table that stands at or near the land surface for a long enough period each year to support aquatic plants.

A more concise definition is a community composed of hydric soil and hydrophytes.

Wetlands have also been described as ecotones, providing a transition between dry land and water bodies. Wetlands exist "...at the interface between truly terrestrial ecosystems and aquatic systems, making them inherently different from each other, yet highly dependent on both."

In environmental decision-making, there are subsets of definitions that are agreed upon to make regulatory and policy decisions.

Under the Ramsar international wetland conservation treaty, wetlands are defined as follows:
Article 1.1: "...wetlands are areas of marsh, fen, peatland or water, whether natural or artificial, permanent or temporary, with water that is static or flowing, fresh, brackish or salt, including areas of marine water the depth of which at low tide does not exceed six meters."
Article 2.1: "[Wetlands] may incorporate riparian and coastal zones adjacent to the wetlands, and islands or bodies of marine water deeper than six meters at low tide lying within the wetlands."
An ecological definition of a wetland is "an ecosystem that arises when inundation by water produces soils dominated by anaerobic and aerobic processes, which, in turn, forces the biota, particularly rooted plants, to adapt to flooding".

Sometimes a precise legal definition of a wetland is required. The definition used for regulation by the United States government is: 'The term "wetlands" means those areas that are inundated or saturated by surface or ground water at a frequency and duration to support, and that under normal circumstances do support, a prevalence of vegetation typically adapted for life in saturated soil conditions. Wetlands generally included swamps, marshes, bogs, and similar areas.'

For each of these definitions and others, regardless of the purpose, hydrology is emphasized (shallow waters, water-logged soils). The soil characteristics and the plants and animals controlled by the wetland hydrology are often additional components of the definitions.

Types 

Wetlands can be tidal (inundated by tides) or non-tidal. The water in wetlands is either freshwater, brackish, or saltwater. There are four main kinds of wetlands – marsh, swamp, bog, and fen (bogs and fens being types of peatlands or mires). Some experts also recognize wet meadows and aquatic ecosystems as additional wetland types. Sub-types include mangrove forests, carrs, pocosins, floodplains, peatlands, vernal pools, sinks, and many others. 

The following three groups are used within Australia to classify wetland by type: Marine and coastal zone wetlands, inland wetlands and human-made wetlands. In the US, the best known classifications are the Cowardin classification system and the hydrogeomorphic (HGM) classification system. The Cowardin system includes five main types of wetlands: marine (ocean-associated); estuarine (mixed ocean- and river-associated); riverine (within river channels); lacustrine (lake-associated); and palustrine (inland nontidal habitats).

Peatlands 
Peatlands are a unique kind of wetland where lush plant growth and slow decay of dead plants (under anoxic conditions) results in organic peat accumulating; bogs, fens, and mires are different names for peatlands.

Wetland names 
Variations of names for wetland systems:

Bayou
Flooded grasslands and savannas
Marsh
Brackish marsh
Freshwater marsh
Mire
Fen
Bog
Riparian zone
Swamp
Freshwater swamp forest
Coniferous swamp
Peat swamp forest
Mangrove swamp
Vernal pool

Some wetlands have localized names unique to a region such as the prairie potholes of North America's northern plain, pocosins, Carolina bays and baygalls of the Southeastern US, mallines of Argentina, Mediterranean seasonal ponds of Europe and California, turloughs of Ireland, billabongs of Australia, among many others.

Locations

By temperature zone 

Wetlands are found throughout the world in different climates. Temperatures vary greatly depending on the location of the wetland. Many of the world's wetlands are in the temperate zones, midway between the North or South Poles and the equator. In these zones, summers are warm and winters are cold, but temperatures are not extreme. In subtropical zone wetlands, such as along the Gulf of Mexico, average temperatures might be . Wetlands in the tropics are subjected to much higher temperatures for a large portion of the year. Temperatures for wetlands on the Arabian Peninsula can exceed  and these habitats would therefore be subject to rapid evaporation. Peatlands in arctic and subarctic regions insulate the permafrost, thus delaying or preventing its thawing during summer, as well as inducing its formation.

By precipitation amount 
The amount of precipitation a wetland receives varies widely according to its area. In some drier regions, wetlands exist where as little as  precipitation occurs each year.

Temporal variation:
Perennial systems
Seasonal systems
Episodic (periodic or intermittent) systems
Ephemeral (short-lived) systems
Surface flow may occur in some segments, with subsurface flow in other segments.

Processes
Wetlands vary widely due to local and regional differences in topography, hydrology, vegetation, and other factors, including human involvement. Other important factors include fertility, natural disturbance, competition, herbivory, burial and salinity. When peat accumulates, bogs and fens arise.

Hydrology
The most important factor producing wetlands is hydrology, or flooding. The duration of flooding or prolonged soil saturation by groundwater determines whether the resulting wetland has aquatic, marsh or swamp vegetation. Other important factors include soil fertility, natural disturbance, competition, herbivory, burial, and salinity. When peat from dead plants accumulates, bogs and fens develop. 

Wetland hydrology is associated with the spatial and temporal dispersion, flow, and physio-chemical attributes of surface and ground waters. Sources of hydrological flows into wetlands are predominantly precipitation, surface water (saltwater or freshwater), and groundwater. Water flows out of wetlands by evapotranspiration, surface flows and tides, and subsurface water outflow. Hydrodynamics (the movement of water through and from a wetland) affects hydro-periods (temporal fluctuations in water levels) by controlling the water balance and water storage within a wetland.

Landscape characteristics control wetland hydrology and water chemistry. The O2 and CO2 concentrations of water depend on temperature, atmospheric pressure and mixing with the air (from winds or water flows). Water chemistry within wetlands is determined by the pH, salinity, nutrients, conductivity, soil composition, hardness, and the sources of water. Water chemistry varies across landscapes and climatic regions. Wetlands are generally minerotrophic (waters contain dissolved materials from soils) with the exception of ombrotrophic bogs that are fed only by water from precipitation.

Because bogs receive most of their water from the atmosphere, their water usually has low mineral ionic composition. In contrast, wetlands fed by groundwater or tides have a higher concentration of dissolved nutrients and minerals.

Fen peatlands receive water both from precipitation and ground water in varying amounts so their water chemistry ranges from acidic with low levels of dissolved minerals to alkaline with high accumulation of calcium and magnesium.

Role of salinity

Salinity has a strong influence on wetland water chemistry, particularly in coastal wetlands and in arid and semiarid regions with large precipitation deficits. Natural salinity is regulated by interactions between ground and surface water, which may be influenced by human activity.

Soil
Carbon is the major nutrient cycled within wetlands. Most nutrients, such as sulfur, phosphorus, carbon, and nitrogen are found within the soil of wetlands. Anaerobic and aerobic respiration in the soil influences the nutrient cycling of carbon, hydrogen, oxygen, and nitrogen, and the solubility of phosphorus thus contributing to the chemical variations in its water. Wetlands with low pH and saline conductivity may reflect the presence of acid sulfates and wetlands with average salinity levels can be heavily influenced by calcium or magnesium. Biogeochemical processes in wetlands are determined by soils with low redox potential. Wetland soils are identified by redoxymorphic mottles (often from iron oxide rust) or low chroma intensity, as determined by the Munsell Color System.

Water chemistry 
Due to the low dissolved oxygen (DO) content, and relatively low nutrient balance of wetland environments, most wetlands are very susceptible to alterations in water chemistry. Key factors that are assessed to determine water quality include:
 Major anion analysis: (HCO3−,Cl−,NO3−,SO42-)
 Major cation analysis (Ca2+, Mg2+, Na+, K+)
 pH
 Conductivity- conductivity increases with more dissolved ions in the water
 Turbidity
 Dissolved oxygen
 Temperature
 Total dissolved solids
 Gas emissions (carbon dioxide and methane; CO2 and CH4)

These chemical factors can be used to quantify wetland disturbances, and often provide information as to whether a wetland is fed by precipitation, surface water or groundwater, due to the different ion characteristics of the different water sources. Wetlands are adept at impacting the water chemistry of streams or water bodies that interact with them, and can process ions that result from water pollution such as acid mine drainage or urban runoff.,

Biota
The biota of a wetland system includes its plants (flora) and animals (fauna) and microbes (bacteria, fungi). The most important factor affecting the biota is the hydroperiod, or the duration of flooding. Other important factors include fertility and salinity of the water or soils. The chemistry of water flowing into wetlands depends on the source of water, the geological material that it flows through and the nutrients discharged from organic matter in the soils and plants at higher elevations. Biota may vary within a wetland seasonally or in response to flood regimes.

Flora

There are four main groups of hydrophytes that are found in wetland systems throughout the world. 

Submerged wetland vegetation can grow in saline and fresh-water conditions. Some species have underwater flowers, while others have long stems to allow the flowers to reach the surface. Submerged species provide a food source for native fauna, habitat for invertebrates, and also possess filtration capabilities. Examples include seagrasses and eelgrass.

Floating water plants or floating vegetation are usually small, like those in the Lemnoideae subfamily (duckweeds).
Emergent vegetation like the cattails (Typha spp.), sedges (Carex spp.) and arrow arum (Peltandra virginica) rise above the surface of the water.

When trees and shrubs comprise much of the plant cover in saturated soils, those areas in most cases are called swamps. The upland boundary of swamps is determined partly by water levels. This can be affected by dams Some swamps can be dominated by a single species, such as silver maple swamps around the Great Lakes. Others, like those of the Amazon basin, have large numbers of different tree species. Other examples include cypress (Taxodium) and mangrove swamps.

Fauna

Many species of fish are highly dependent on wetland ecosystems. Seventy-five percent of the United States' commercial fish and shellfish stocks depend solely on estuaries to survive. Tropical fish species need mangroves for critical hatchery and nursery grounds and the coral reef system for food.

Amphibians such as frogs and salamanders need both terrestrial and aquatic habitats in which to reproduce and feed. Because amphibians often inhabit depressional wetlands like prairie potholes and Carolina bays, the connectivity among these isolated wetlands is an important control of regional populations. While tadpoles feed on algae, adult frogs forage on insects. Frogs are sometimes used as an indicator of ecosystem health because their thin skin permits absorption of nutrients and toxins from the surrounding environment resulting in increased extinction rates in unfavorable and polluted environmental conditions.
 
Reptiles such as snakes, lizards, turtles, alligators and crocodiles are common in wetlands of some regions. In freshwater wetlands of the Southeastern US, alligators are common and a freshwater species of crocodile occurs in South Florida. The Florida Everglades is the only place in the world where both crocodiles and alligators coexist. The saltwater crocodile inhabits estuaries and mangroves and can be seen along the Eastern coastline of Australia. Snapping turtles are one of the many kinds of turtles found in wetlands.
 
Birds, particularly waterfowl and wading birds, use wetlands extensively.

Mammals of wetlands include numerous small and medium-sized species such as voles, bats, muskrats and platypus in addition to large herbivorous and apex predator species such as the beaver, coypu, swamp rabbit, Florida panther, and moose. Wetlands attract many mammals due to abundant seeds, berries, and other vegetation as food for herbivores, as well as abundant populations of invertebrates, small reptiles and amphibians as prey for predators.

Invertebrates of wetlands include aquatic insects (such as dragonflies, aquatic bugs and beetles, midges, mosquitoes), crustaceans (such as crabs, crayfish, shrimps, microcrustaceans), mollusks (such as clams, mussels, snails), and worms (such as polychaetes, oligochaetes, leeches), among others. Invertebrates comprise more than half of the known animal species in wetlands, and are considered the primary food web link between plants and higher animals (such as fish and birds). The low oxygen conditions in wetland water and their frequent flooding and drying (daily in tidal wetlands, seasonally in temporary ponds and floodplains) prevent many invertebrates from inhabiting wetlands, and thus the invertebrate fauna of wetlands is often less diverse than some other kinds of habitat (such as streams, coral reefs, and forests).  Some wetland invertebrates thrive in habitats that lack predatory fish. Many insects only inhabit wetlands as aquatic immatures (nymphs, larvae) and the flying adults inhabit upland habitats, returning to the wetlands to lay eggs. For instance, a common hoverfly Syritta pipiens inhabits wetlands as larvae (maggots), living in wet, rotting organic matter; these insects then visit terrestrial flowers as adult flies.

Algae
Algae are diverse plant-like organisms that can vary in size, color, and shape. Algae occur naturally in habitats such as inland lakes, inter-tidal zones, and damp soil and provide a food source for many animals, including some invertebrates, fish, turtles, and frogs. There are several groups of algae:

Phytoplankton are microscopic, free-floating algae. These algae are so tiny that on average, 50 of these lined up end-to-end would only measure one millimeter. Phytoplankton are the basis of the food web in many water bodies being responsible for much of the primary production using photosynthesis to fix carbon.Filamentous algae are long strands of algal cells that can form floating mats. Periphyton (or epiphyton) are algae that grow as surface biofilms on plants, wood, and other substrates.
Chara and Nitella algae are upright algae that look like a submerged plants with roots.

Disturbances and human impacts 

Wetlands, the functions and services they provide as well as their flora and fauna, can be affected by several types of disturbances. The disturbances (sometimes termed stressors or alterations) can be human-associated or natural, direct or indirect, reversible or not, and isolated or cumulative. Disturbances exceed the levels or patterns normally found within wetlands of a particular class in a particular region. Predominant disturbances of wetlands include:

 Enrichment/eutrophication
 Organic loading and reduced dissolved oxygen
 Contaminant toxicity
Acidification
Salinization
Sedimentation
 Altered solar input (turbidity/shade)
 Vegetation removal
 Thermal alteration
 Drying/aridification
 Inundation/flooding
Habitat fragmentation
 Other human impacts

Disturbances can be further categorized as follows:
 Minor disturbance: Stress that maintains ecosystem integrity.
 Moderate disturbance: Ecosystem integrity is damaged but can recover in time without assistance.
 Impairment or severe disturbance: Human intervention may be needed in order for ecosystem to recover.

Just a few of the many sources of these disturbances include:
 Drainage
 Development
 Over-grazing
Mining
 Unsustainable water use
Nutrient pollution (anthropogenic nitrogen inputs to aquatic systems have drastically effected the dissolved nitrogen content of wetlands, introducing higher nutrient availability which leads to eutrophication.)
Water pollution
They can be manifested partly as:
Water scarcity
Impacts to endangered species
 Disruption of wildlife breeding grounds
 Imbalance in sediment load and nutrient filtration
Biodiversity loss occurs in wetland systems through land use changes, habitat destruction, pollution, exploitation of resources, and invasive species. Vulnerable, threatened, and endangered species include 17% of waterfowl, 38% of fresh-water dependent mammals, 33% of freshwater fish, 26% of freshwater amphibians, 72% of freshwater turtles, 86% of marine turtles, 43% of crocodilians and 27% of coral reef-building species. Introduced aquatic plants in different wetland systems can have large impacts. The introduction of water hyacinth, a native plant of South America into Lake Victoria in East Africa as well as duckweed into non-native areas of Queensland, Australia, have overtaken entire wetland systems overwhelming the habitats and reducing the diversity of native plants and animals. This is largely due to the phenomenal growth rates of the plants and their ability to float and grow across the entire surface of the water.

Conversion to dry land 
Due to their productivity, wetlands are often converted into dry land with dykes and drains and used for agricultural purposes. The construction of dykes, and dams, has negative consequences for individual wetlands and entire watersheds. Their proximity to lakes and rivers means that they are often developed for human settlement. Once settlements are constructed and protected by dykes, the settlements then become vulnerable to land subsidence and ever increasing risk of flooding. The Mississippi River Delta around New Orleans, Louisiana is a well-known example; the Danube Delta in Europe is another.

Ecosystem services 

Depending on a wetland's geographic and topographic location, the functions it performs can support multiple ecosystem services, values, or benefits. United Nations Millennium Ecosystem Assessment and Ramsar Convention described wetlands as a whole to be of biosphere significance and societal importance in the following areas:

Water storage (flood control)
Groundwater replenishment
Shoreline stabilization and storm protection
Water purification
 Wastewater treatment (in constructed wetlands)
Reservoirs of biodiversity
Pollination
Wetland products
Cultural values
Recreation and tourism
Climate change mitigation and adaptation

According to the Ramsar Convention:

The economic worth of the ecosystem services provided to society by intact, naturally functioning wetlands is frequently much greater than the perceived benefits of converting them to 'more valuable' intensive land use – particularly as the profits from unsustainable use often go to relatively few individuals or corporations, rather than being shared by society as a whole.

Unless otherwise cited, ecosystem services information is based on the following series of references.

To replace these wetland ecosystem services, enormous amounts of money would need to be spent on water purification plants, dams, levees, and other hard infrastructure, and many of the services are impossible to replace.

Storage reservoirs and flood protection 

Floodplains and closed-depression wetlands can provide the functions of storage reservoirs and flood protection.

The wetland system of floodplains is formed from major rivers downstream from their headwaters. "The floodplains of major rivers act as natural storage reservoirs, enabling excess water to spread out over a wide area, which reduces its depth and speed. Wetlands close to the headwaters of streams and rivers can slow down rainwater runoff and spring snowmelt so that it doesn't run straight off the land into water courses. This can help prevent sudden, damaging floods downstream." Notable river systems that produce wide floodplains include the Nile River, the Niger river inland delta, the Zambezi River flood plain, the Okavango River inland delta, the Kafue River flood plain, the Lake Bangweulu flood plain (Africa), Mississippi River (USA), Amazon River (South America), Yangtze River (China), Danube River (Central Europe) and Murray-Darling River (Australia).

Drainage of floodplains or development activities that narrow floodplain corridors (such as the construction of levees) reduces the ability of coupled river-floodplain systems to control flood damage. That is because modified and less expansive systems must still manage the same amount of precipitation, causing flood peaks to be higher or deeper and floodwaters to travel faster.

Water management engineering developments in the past century have degraded floodplain wetlands through the construction of artificial embankments such as dykes, bunds, levees, weirs, barrages and dams. All concentrate water into a main channel and waters that historically spread slowly over a large, shallow area are concentrated. Loss of wetland floodplains results in more severe and damaging flooding. Catastrophic human impact in the Mississippi River floodplains was seen in death of several hundred individuals during a levee breach in New Orleans caused by Hurricane Katrina. Human-made embankments along the Yangtze River floodplains have caused the main channel of the river to become prone to more frequent and damaging flooding. Some of these events include the loss of riparian vegetation, a 30% loss of the vegetation cover throughout the river's basin, a doubling of the percentage of the land affected by soil erosion, and a reduction in reservoir capacity through siltation build-up in floodplain lakes.

Groundwater replenishment
Groundwater replenishment can be achieved for example by marsh, swamp, and subterranean karst and cave hydrological systems.

The surface water visibly seen in wetlands only represents a portion of the overall water cycle, which also includes atmospheric water (precipitation) and groundwater. Many wetlands are directly linked to groundwater and they can be a crucial regulator of both the quantity and quality of water found below the ground. Wetlands that have permeable substrates like limestone or occur in areas with highly variable and fluctuating water tables have especially important roles in groundwater replenishment or water recharge. Substrates that are porous allow water to filter down through the soil and underlying rock into aquifers which are the source of much of the world's drinking water. Wetlands can also act as recharge areas when the surrounding water table is low and as a discharge zone when it is high. Karst (cave) systems are a unique example of this system and can be a connection of underground rivers influenced by rain and other forms of precipitation to the surface.

Shoreline stabilization and storm protection

Mangroves, coral reefs, salt marsh can help with shoreline stabilization and storm protection.

Tidal and inter-tidal wetland systems protect and stabilize coastal zones. Coral reefs provide a protective barrier to coastal shoreline. Mangroves stabilize the coastal zone from the interior and will migrate with the shoreline to remain adjacent to the boundary of the water. The main conservation benefit these systems have against storms and storm surges is the ability to reduce the speed and height of waves and floodwaters.

The number of people who live and work near the coast is expected to grow immensely over the next fifty years. From an estimated 200 million people that currently live in low-lying coastal regions, the development of urban coastal centers is projected to increase the population by fivefold within 50 years.
The United Kingdom has begun the concept of managed coastal realignment. This management technique provides shoreline protection through restoration of natural wetlands rather than through applied engineering. In East Asia, reclamation of coastal wetlands has resulted in widespread transformation of the coastal zone, and up to 65% of coastal wetlands have been destroyed by coastal development. One analysis using the impact of hurricanes versus storm protection provided naturally by wetlands projected the value of this service at US$33,000/hectare/year.

Water purification
Water purification can be provided by floodplains, closed-depression wetlands, mudflat, freshwater marsh, salt marsh, mangroves.

Nutrient retention: Wetlands cycle both sediments and nutrients, sometimes serving as buffers between terrestrial and aquatic ecosystems. A natural function of wetland vegetation is the up-take, storage, and (for nitrate) the removal of nutrients found in runoff water from the surrounding landscapes. In many wetlands, microbial processes convert soluble nutrients to a gaseous form, such as denitrification of nitrate, which then moves the nitrate to the atmosphere mostly as harmless nitrogen gas.

Sediment and heavy metal traps: Precipitation and surface runoff induces soil erosion, transporting sediment in suspension into and through waterways. These sediments move towards larger and more sizable waterways through a natural process that moves water towards oceans. All types of sediments whether composed of clay, silt, sand or gravel and rock can be carried into wetland systems through erosion. Wetland vegetation acts as a physical barrier to slow water flow and then trap sediment for both short or long periods of time. Suspended sediment can contain heavy metals that are also retained when wetlands trap the sediment. In some cases, certain metals are taken up through wetland plant stems, roots, and leaves. For example, many floating plant species such as water hyacinth (Eichhornia crassipes), duckweed (Lemna) and water fern (Azolla) store iron and copper found in wastewater; these plants also extract pathogens. Fast-growing plants rooted in the soils of wetlands such as cattail (Typha) and reed (Phragmites) also contribute to heavy metal up-take. On the other hand, some types of wetlands facilitate the mobilization and bioavailability of mercury (another heavy metal), which in its methyl mercury form increases the risk of bioaccumulation in fish important to animal food webs and harvested for human consumption.

Capacity: The ability of wetland systems to store or remove nutrients and trap sediment and associated metals is highly efficient and effective but each system has a threshold. An overabundance of nutrient input from fertilizer run-off, sewage effluent, or non-point pollution will cause eutrophication. Upstream erosion from deforestation can overwhelm wetlands making them shrink in size and cause dramatic biodiversity loss through excessive sedimentation load. Retaining high levels of metals in sediments is problematic if the sediments become resuspended or oxygen and pH levels change at a future time. The capacity of wetland vegetation to store heavy metals depends on the particular metal, oxygen and pH status of wetland sediments and overlying water, water flow rate (detention time), wetland size, season, climate, type of plant, and other factors.

The capacity of a wetland to store sediment, nutrients, and metals can be diminished if sediments are compacted such as by vehicles or heavy equipment, or are regularly tilled. Unnatural changes in water levels and water sources also can affect the water purification function. If water purification functions are impaired, excessive loads of nutrients enter waterways and cause eutrophication. This is of particular concern in temperate coastal systems. The main sources of coastal eutrophication are industrially made nitrogen, which is used as fertilizer in agricultural practices, as well as septic waste runoff. Nitrogen is the limiting nutrient for photosynthetic processes in saline systems, however in excess, it can lead to an overproduction of organic matter that then leads to hypoxic and anoxic zones within the water column. Without oxygen, other organisms cannot survive, including economically important finfish and shellfish species.

Wastewater treatment 
Constructed wetlands are built for wastewater treatment.An example of how a natural wetland is used to provide some degree of sewage treatment is the East Kolkata Wetlands in Kolkata, India. The wetlands cover , and are used to treat Kolkata's sewage. The nutrients contained in the wastewater sustain fish farms and agriculture.

Reservoirs of biodiversity
Wetland systems' rich biodiversity has becoming a focal point catalysed by the Ramsar Convention and World Wildlife Fund. The impact of maintaining biodiversity is seen at the local level through job creation, sustainability, and community productivity. A good example is the Lower Mekong basin which runs through Cambodia, Laos, and Vietnam, supporting over 55 million people. 

Biodiverse river basins: The Amazon holds more than 3,000 species of freshwater fish species within the boundaries of its basin. Fishes consuming fallen fruit, e.g., the large-bodied characid, Colossoma macropomum enter the Amazonian floodplains during annual floods egesting viable seeds thus acting as an important agent of dispersal.

Productive intertidal zones: Intertidal mudflats have a level of productivity similar to that of some wetlands even while possessing a low number of species. The abundance of invertebrates found within the mud are a food source for migratory waterfowl.

Critical life-stage habitat: Mudflats, saltmarshes, mangroves, and seagrass beds have high levels of both species richness and productivity, and are home to important nursery areas for many commercial fish stocks.

Genetic diversity: Populations of many species are confined geographically to only one or a few wetland systems, often due to the long period of time that the wetlands have been physically isolated from other aquatic sources. For example, the number of endemic species in the Selenga River Delta of Lake Baikal in Russia classifies it as a hotspot for biodiversity and one of the most biodiverse wetlands in the entire world.

Wetland products

Wetland productivity is linked to the climate, wetland type, and nutrient availability. Low water and occasional drying of the wetland bottom during droughts (dry marsh phase) stimulates plant recruitment from a diverse seed bank and increases productivity by mobilizing nutrients. In contrast, high water during deluges (lake marsh phase) causes turnover in plant populations and increases open water, but lowers overall productivity. From open water to complete vegetation cover, annual net primary productivity may vary 20-fold. The grasses of fertile floodplains such as the Nile can be highly productive, especially plants such as Arundo donax (giant reed), Cyperus papyrus (papyrus), Phragmites (reed) and Typha (cattail).

Wetlands naturally produce an array of vegetation and other ecological products that can be harvested for personal and commercial use. Many fishes have all or part of their life-cycle occurring within a wetland system. Fresh and saltwater fish are the main source of protein for about one billion people and comprise 15% of an additional 3.5 billion people's protein intake. Another food staple found in wetland systems is rice, a popular grain that is consumed at the rate of one fifth of the total global calorie count. In Bangladesh, Cambodia and Vietnam, where rice paddies are predominant on the landscape, rice consumption reach 70%. Some native wetland plants in the Caribbean and Australia are harvested sustainably for medicinal compounds; these include the red mangrove (Rhizophora mangle) which possesses antibacterial, wound-healing, anti-ulcer effects, and antioxidant properties.

The nipa palm of Asia (sugar, vinegar, alcohol, and fodder) and honey collection from mangroves contribute to human diets and people's income. Coastal Thailand villages earn the key portion of their income from sugar production while Cuba relocates thousands of beehives each year to track the seasonal flowering of the mangrove Avicennia. Other mangrove-derived products include fuelwood, salt (produced by evaporating seawater), animal fodder, traditional medicines (e.g. from mangrove bark), fibers for textiles and dyes and tannins.

Over-fishing is a major problem for sustainable use of wetlands. Concerns are developing over certain aspects of farm fishing, which uses natural wetlands and waterways to harvest fish for human consumption. Aquaculture is continuing to develop rapidly throughout the Asia-Pacific region especially in China where 90% of the total number of aquaculture farms occur, contributing 80% of global value. Some aquaculture has eliminated massive areas of wetland through practices such as the shrimp farming industry's destruction of mangroves. Even though the damaging impact of large-scale shrimp farming on the coastal ecosystem in many Asian countries has been widely recognized for quite some time now, it has proved difficult to mitigate since other employment avenues for people are lacking. Also burgeoning demand for shrimp globally has provided a large and ready market.

Additional services and uses of wetlands 
Some types of wetlands can serve as fire breaks that help slow the spread of minor wildfires. Larger wetland systems can influence local precipitation patterns. Some boreal wetland systems in catchment headwaters may help extend the period of flow and maintain water temperature in connected downstream waters. Pollination services are supported by many wetlands which may provide the only suitable habitat for pollinating insects, birds, and mammals in highly developed areas.

Conservation

Wetlands have historically subjected to large draining efforts for development (real estate or agriculture), and flooding to create recreational lakes or generate hydropower. Some of the world's most important agricultural areas were wetlands that have been converted to farmland. Since the 1970s, more focus has been put on preserving wetlands for their natural functions. Since 1900 between 65-70% of the world's wetlands have been lost. In order to maintain wetlands and sustain their functions, alterations and disturbances that are outside the normal range of variation should be minimized.

Balancing wetland conservation with the needs of people
Wetlands are vital ecosystems that enhance the livelihoods for the millions of people who live in and around them. The Millennium Development Goals (MDGs) called for different sectors to join forces to secure wetland environments in the context of sustainable development and improving human wellbeing. Studies have shown that it is possible to conserve wetlands while improving the livelihoods of people living among them. Case studies conducted in Malawi and Zambia looked at how dambos – wet, grassy valleys or depressions where water seeps to the surface – can be farmed sustainably. Project outcomes included a high yield of crops, development of sustainable farming techniques, and  water management strategies that generate enough water for irrigation.

Ramsar Convention

The Convention on Wetlands of International Importance, especially as Waterfowl Habitat, or Ramsar Convention, is an international treaty designed to address global concerns regarding wetland loss and degradation. The primary purposes of the treaty are to list wetlands of international importance and to promote their wise use, with the ultimate goal of preserving the world's wetlands. Methods include restricting access to some wetland areas, as well as educating the public to combat the misconception that wetlands are wastelands. The Convention works closely with five International Organisation Partners (IOPs). These are: Birdlife International, the IUCN, the International Water Management Institute, Wetlands International and the World Wide Fund for Nature. The partners provide technical expertise, help conduct or facilitate field studies and provide financial support. The IOPs also participate regularly as observers in all meetings of the Conference of the Parties and the Standing Committee and as full members of the Scientific and Technical Review Panel.

Restoration
Restoration and restoration ecologists intend to return wetlands to their natural trajectory by aiding directly with the natural processes of the ecosystem. These direct methods vary with respect to the degree of physical manipulation of the natural environment and each are associated with different levels of restoration. Restoration is needed after disturbance or perturbation of a wetland. Disturbances include exogenous factors such as flooding or drought. Other external damage may be anthropogenic disturbance caused by clear-cut harvesting of trees, oil and gas extraction, poorly defined infrastructure installation, over grazing of livestock, ill-considered recreational activities, alteration of wetlands including dredging, draining, and filling, and other negative human impacts. Disturbance puts different levels of stress on an environment depending on the type and duration of disturbance. There is no one way to restore a wetland and the level of restoration required will be based on the level of disturbance although, each method of restoration does require preparation and administration.

Levels of restoration
Factors influencing selected approach may include budget, time scale limitations, project goals, level of disturbance, landscape and ecological constraints, political and administrative agendas and socioeconomic priorities.

Prescribed natural or assisted regeneration 
For this strategy, there is no biophysical manipulation and the ecosystem is left to recover based on the process of succession alone. The focus is to eliminate and prevent further disturbance from occurring and for this type of restoration requires prior research to understand the probability that the wetland will recover naturally. This is likely to be the first method of approach since it is the least intrusive and least expensive although some biophysical non-intrusive manipulation may be required to enhance the rate of succession to an acceptable level. Example methods include prescribed burns to small areas, promotion of site specific soil microbiota and plant growth using nucleation planting whereby plants radiate from an initial planting site, and promotion of niche diversity or increasing the range of niches to promote use by a variety of different species. These methods can make it easier for the natural species to flourish by removing environmental impediments and can speed up the process of succession.

Partial reconstruction 
For this strategy, a mixture of natural regeneration and manipulated environmental control is used. This may require some engineering, and more intensive biophysical manipulations including ripping of subsoil, agrichemical applications of herbicides or insecticides, laying of mulch, mechanical seed dispersal, and tree planting on a large scale. In these circumstances the wetland is impaired and without human assistance it would not recover within an acceptable period of time as determined by ecologists. Methods of restoration used will have to be determined on a site by site basis as each location will require a different approach based on levels of disturbance and the local ecosystem dynamics.

Complete reconstruction 
This most expensive and intrusive method of reconstruction requires engineering and ground up reconstruction. Because there is a redesign of the entire ecosystem it is important that the natural trajectory of the ecosystem be considered and that the plant species promoted will eventually return the ecosystem towards its natural trajectory.

Climate change aspects

Greenhouse gas emissions 
In Southeast Asia, peatswamp forests and soils are being drained, burnt, mined, and overgrazed, contributing to climate change. As a result of peat drainage, the organic carbon that had built up over thousands of years and is normally under water is suddenly exposed to the air. The peat decomposes and is converted into carbon dioxide (CO2), which is then released into the atmosphere. Peat fires cause the same process to occur rapidly and in addition create enormous clouds of smoke that cross international borders, which now happens almost yearly in Southeast Asia. While peatlands constitute only 3% of the world's land area, their degradation produces 7% of all CO2 emissions.

Climate change mitigation 

Many recent studies and reviews have favorably identified the potential for such coastal “blue carbon” ecosystems to provide a natural climate solution in two ways: by conservation, reducing the greenhouse gas emissions arising from the loss and degradation of such habitats, and by restoration, to increase carbon dioxide drawdown and its long-term storage. However, CO2 removal using coastal blue carbon restoration has questionable cost-effectiveness when considered only as a climate mitigation action, either for carbon-offsetting or for inclusion in Nationally Determined Contributions.

When wetlands are restored they have mitigation effects through their ability to sink carbon, converting a greenhouse gas (carbon dioxide) to solid plant material through the process of photosynthesis, and also through their ability to store and regulate water. 

Wetlands store approximately 44.6 million tonnes of carbon per year globally (estimate from 2003).

Coastal wetlands, such as tropical mangroves and some temperate salt marshes, are known to be sinks for carbon that otherwise contribute to climate change in its gaseous forms (carbon dioxide and methane). The ability of many tidal wetlands to store carbon and minimize methane flux from tidal sediments has led to sponsorship of blue carbon initiatives that are intended to enhance those processes.

Climate change adaptation 

The restoration of coastal blue carbon ecosystems is highly advantageous for climate change adaptation, coastal protection, food provision and biodiversity conservation.

Since the middle of the 20th century, human-caused climate change has resulted in observable changes in the global water cycle. A warming climate makes extremely wet and very dry occurrences more severe, causing more severe floods and droughts. For this reason, some of the ecosystem services that wetlands provide (e.g. water storage and flood control, groundwater replenishment, shoreline stabilization and storm protection) are important for climate change adaptation measures. In most parts of the world and under all emission scenarios, water cycle variability and accompanying extremes are anticipated to rise more quickly than the changes of average values.

Valuation 
The value of a wetland to local communities typically involves first mapping a region's wetlands, then assessing the functions and ecosystem services the wetlands provide individually and cumulatively, and finally evaluating that information to prioritize or rank individual wetlands or wetland types for conservation, management, restoration, or development. Over the longer term, it requires keeping inventories of known wetlands and monitoring a representative sample of the wetlands to determine changes due to both natural and human factors.

Assessment

Rapid assessment methods are used to score, rank, rate, or categorize various functions, ecosystem services, species, communities, levels of disturbance, and/or ecological health of a wetland or group of wetlands. This is often done to prioritize particular wetlands for conservation (avoidance) or to determine the degree to which loss or alteration of wetland functions should be compensated, such as by restoring degraded wetlands elsewhere or providing additional protections to existing wetlands. Rapid assessment methods are also applied before and after a wetland has been restored or altered, to help monitor or predict the effects of those actions on various wetland functions and the services they provide. Assessments are typically considered to be "rapid" when they require only a single visit to the wetland lasting less than one day, which in some cases may include interpretation of aerial imagery and geographic information system (GIS) analyses of existing spatial data, but not detailed post-visit laboratory analyses of water or biological samples. 

To achieve consistency among persons doing the assessment, rapid methods present indicator variables as questions or checklists on standardized data forms, and most methods standardize the scoring or rating procedure that is used to combine question responses into estimates of the levels of specified functions relative to the levels estimated in other wetlands ("calibration sites") assessed previously in a region. Rapid assessment methods, partly because they often use dozens of indicators pertaining to conditions surrounding a wetland as well as within the wetland itself, aim to provide estimates of wetland functions and services that are more accurate and repeatable than simply describing a wetland's class type. A need for wetland assessments to be rapid arises mostly when government agencies set deadlines for decisions affecting a wetland, or when the number of wetlands needing information on their functions or condition is large.

Inventory

Although developing a global inventory of wetlands has proven to be a large and difficult undertaking, many efforts at more local scales have been successful. Current efforts are based on available data, but both classification and spatial resolution have sometimes proven to be inadequate for regional or site-specific environmental management decision-making. It is difficult to identify small, long, and narrow wetlands within the landscape. Many of today's remote sensing satellites do not have sufficient spatial and spectral resolution to monitor wetland conditions, although multispectral IKONOS and QuickBird data may offer improved spatial resolutions once it is 4 m or higher. Majority of the pixels are just mixtures of several plant species or vegetation types and are difficult to isolate which translates into an inability to classify the vegetation that defines the wetland.

Monitoring and mapping

A wetland needs to be monitored over time to assess whether it is functioning at an ecologically sustainable level or whether it is becoming degraded. Degraded wetlands will suffer a loss in water quality, loss of sensitive species, and aberrant functioning of soil geochemical processes.

Practically, many natural wetlands are difficult to monitor from the ground as they quite often are difficult to access and may require exposure to dangerous plants and animals as well as diseases borne by insects or other invertebrates. Therefore, mapping using aerial imagery is one effective tool to monitor a wetland, especially a large wetland, and can also be used to monitor the status of numerous wetlands throughout a watershed or region. Many remote sensing methods can be used to map wetlands. Remote-sensing technology permits the acquisition of timely digital data on a repetitive basis. This repeat coverage allows wetlands, as well as the adjacent land-cover and land-use types, to be monitored seasonally and/or annually. Using digital data provides a standardized data-collection procedure and an opportunity for data integration within a geographic information system.

Legislation

International efforts 
Ramsar Convention
North American Waterfowl Management Plan

National efforts

United States
Each country and region tends to have its own definition of wetlands for legal purposes. In the United States, wetlands are defined as "those areas that are inundated or saturated by surface or groundwater at a frequency and duration sufficient to support, and that under normal circumstances do support, a prevalence of vegetation typically adapted for life in saturated soil conditions. Wetlands generally include swamps, marshes, bogs and similar areas". This definition has been used in the enforcement of the Clean Water Act. Some US states, such as Massachusetts and New York, have separate definitions that may differ from the federal government's.

In the United States Code, the term wetland is defined "as land that (A) has a predominance of hydric soils, (B) is inundated or saturated by surface or groundwater at a frequency and duration sufficient to support a prevalence of hydrophytic vegetation typically adapted for life in saturated soil conditions and (C) under normal circumstances supports a prevalence of such vegetation." Related to these legal definitions, "normal circumstances" are expected to occur during the wet portion of the growing season under normal climatic conditions (not unusually dry or unusually wet), and in the absence of significant disturbance. It is not uncommon for a wetland to be dry for long portions of the growing season but under normal environmental conditions, the soils will be saturated to the surface or inundated creating anaerobic conditions persisting through the wet portion of the growing season.

Canada 
The Federal Policy on Wetland Conservation
Other Individual Provincial and Territorial Based Policies

Examples 

The world's largest wetlands include the swamp forests of the Amazon River basin, the peatlands of the West Siberian Plain, the Pantanal in South America, and the Sundarbans in the Ganges-Brahmaputra delta.

See also

 Converted wetland
 Groundwater-dependent ecosystems
 Paludification
 Slough

References

 
Aquatic ecology
Environmental terminology
Freshwater ecology
Habitat
Terrestrial biomes
Bodies of water